Cruel World is a 2005 American independent horror comedy film starring Edward Furlong, Laura Ramsey, Daniel Franzese, Nate Parker, Brian Geraghty, and Jaime Pressly. The film combines elements of a typical slasher film with elements of reality television.

The film is about a psychotic man who loses a reality game show and subsequently kills the host. He uses the house where the show took place to film his own reality show. In the show, several contestants perform challenges, and the losers are killed rather than being sent home. The killings are done in serial killer style, and filmed as snuff films.

Plot 
Cathy Anderson, the former star of a reality show similar to The Bachelor, is now married and living with her husband in the house where the show took place. The house still has several secret rooms and passages, as well as a host of cameras all over the estate.

Philip Markham, who was a contestant on the show, comes to the home for a visit. Cathy is initially put off by his odd behavior, and feels more and more uncomfortable as Philip reminisces about the show. Philip tells Cathy he has sent out applications to colleges all over the country for his own reality show, which will take place in Cathy's house. Philip then murders Cathy and her husband.

Later, the contestants—four men and five women—arrive. Philip reveals to them that after the first night he will not feed them. They go through different challenges, including locking themselves in coffins and trying to find the key inside. The challenges are more excessive than most reality show challenges, and often try to instill great fear into the contestants.

Initially, contestants are voted off the show; however, as the game goes on, they realize what is going on and start trying to escape. In either case, they are killed either by Philip or his assistant, his brother Claude. Gradually all the contestants are eliminated except Jenny, on whom Claude has a crush. After Jenny wins, she is taken back to the house and guarded by Claude. Knowing that Claude likes her, Jenny begins flirting with him, telling him that she loves him and kissing him. Claude lets her go, but Philip finds out and captures Jenny before she can escape. Jennifer's attempted escape attracts the attention of the police; Philip kills one, then escapes himself, telling Claude to stay. As Philip escapes, police enter the house and arrest Claude.

The final scene shows Jenny and a friend walking into a monorail when a message appears on her cell phone: "Please Leave Your Cell Phones By The Door". Philip appears on her phone and a hand grabs her by her shoulder, ending the film.

Cast 
 Edward Furlong as Philip Markham
 Laura Ramsey as Jenny
 Susan Ward as Ashley
 Daniel Franzese as Claude Markham
 Andrew Keegan as Bobby
 Sanoe Lake as Ruby
 Aimee Garcia as Gina
 Joel Michaely as Jack
 Nate Parker as Techno
 Nicole Bilderback as Mikko
 Brian Geraghty as Collin
 Jaime Pressly as Catherine Anderson
 James Patrick Stuart as Deputy Grady

Production 
The shooting of Cruel World began in July 2004 and took place in Albuquerque, New Mexico.

Release 
Cruel World was released on DVD April 8, 2008.

Reception 
James Bowman of The New York Sun called it "a dreadful mess of a movie" that unsuccessfully tried to mix satire with horror.  Bloody Disgusting rated it 2/5 stars and wrote that the boring kills failed to make up for the poor writing and execution.  Scott Foy of Dread Central rated it 1/5 stars and called it "simply an abject failure any which way you cut it."  Mike Long of DVD Talk rated it 1.5/5 stars and wrote that the film had "an awesome concept" but "simply doesn't work."

References

External links
 
 
 
 

2005 films
2005 comedy horror films
2005 independent films
2000s slasher films
2000s serial killer films
American comedy horror films
American independent films
Films about snuff films
Films about television
Films about mental health
American serial killer films
American slasher films
Films shot in New Mexico
2005 comedy films
2000s English-language films
2000s American films